Abaciscus stellifera is a species of moth belonging to the family Geometridae. It was described by entomologist William Warren (entomologist) in 1896, originally under the name Enantiodes stellifera. It is known from the north-eastern Himalaya.

References

Boarmiini
Moths described in 1896
Moths of Asia